The following is a partial list of the "C" codes for Medical Subject Headings (MeSH), as defined by the United States National Library of Medicine (NLM).

This list continues the information at List of MeSH codes (C16). Codes following these are found at List of MeSH codes (C18). For other MeSH codes, see List of MeSH codes.

The source for this content is the set of 2006 MeSH Trees from the NLM.

– skin and connective tissue diseases

– connective tissue diseases

– alpha 1-antitrypsin deficiency

– cartilage diseases
  – chondromalacia patellae
  – osteochondritis
  – polychondritis, relapsing
  – Tietze syndrome

– cellulitis

– collagen diseases
  – Ehlers–Danlos syndrome
  – keloid
  – acne keloid
  – necrobiotic disorders
  – granuloma annulare
  – necrobiosis lipoidica
  – osteogenesis imperfecta

– cutis laxa

– dermatomyositis

– Dupuytren's contracture

– homocystinuria

– lupus erythematosus, cutaneous
  – lupus erythematosus, discoid
  – panniculitis, lupus erythematosus

– lupus erythematosus, systemic
  – lupus nephritis
  – lupus vasculitis, central nervous system

– Marfan syndrome

– mixed connective tissue disease

– mucinoses
  – ganglion cysts
  – mucinosis, follicular
  – mucopolysaccharidoses
  – mucopolysaccharidosis i
  – mucopolysaccharidosis ii
  – mucopolysaccharidosis iii
  – mucopolysaccharidosis iv
  – mucopolysaccharidosis vi
  – mucopolysaccharidosis vii
  – myxedema
  – scleredema adultorum

– neoplasms, connective tissue
  – myofibroma

– Noonan syndrome

– osteopoikilosis

– panniculitis
  – erythema induratum
  – panniculitis, lupus erythematosus
  – panniculitis, nodular nonsuppurative
  – panniculitis, peritoneal

– penile induration

– pseudoxanthoma elasticum

– rheumatic diseases
  – arthritis, rheumatoid
  – arthritis, juvenile rheumatoid
  – Caplan's syndrome
  – Felty's syndrome
  – rheumatoid nodule
  – Sjögren syndrome
  – spondylitis, ankylosing
  – Still's disease, adult-onset
  – hyperostosis, sternocostoclavicular
  – polymyalgia rheumatica

– scleroderma, localized

– scleroderma, systemic
  – scleroderma, diffuse
  – scleroderma, limited
  – CREST syndrome

– skin diseases

– acneiform eruptions
  – acne keloid
  – acne vulgaris

– angiolymphoid hyperplasia with eosinophilia

– breast diseases
  – breast cyst
  – breast neoplasms
  – breast neoplasms, male
  – carcinoma, ductal, breast
  – phyllodes tumor
  – fibrocystic breast disease
  – gynecomastia
  – lactation disorders
  – galactorrhea
  – Chiari–Frommel syndrome
  – mastitis

– cicatrix
  – cicatrix, hypertrophic
  – keloid
  – acne keloid

– cutaneous fistula

– dermatitis
  – acrodermatitis
  – dermatitis, atopic
  – dermatitis, contact
  – dermatitis, allergic contact
  – dermatitis, photoallergic
  – dermatitis, toxicodendron
  – dermatitis, irritant
  – dermatitis, phototoxic
  – diaper rash
  – dermatitis, occupational
  – dermatitis, exfoliative
  – dermatitis herpetiformis
  – dermatitis, perioral
  – dermatitis, seborrheic
  – drug eruptions
  – epidermal necrolysis, toxic
  – erythema nodosum
  – serum sickness
  – eczema
  – eczema, dyshidrotic
  – intertrigo
  – neurodermatitis
  – radiodermatitis

– dermatomyositis

– erythema
  – erythema chronicum migrans
  – erythema induratum
  – erythema infectiosum
  – erythema multiforme
  – Stevens–Johnson syndrome
  – erythema nodosum
  – Sweet's syndrome

– exanthema
  – exanthema subitum

– facial dermatoses
  – acneiform eruptions
  – acne keloid
  – acne vulgaris
  – dermatitis, perioral

– foot diseases
  – foot dermatoses
  – tinea pedis
  – foot ulcer
  – immersion foot

– hair diseases
  – folliculitis
  – acne keloid
  – hirsutism
  – hypertrichosis
  – hypotrichosis
  – alopecia
  – alopecia areata
  – mucinosis, follicular
  – Menkes kinky hair syndrome

– hand dermatoses

– keratoacanthoma

– keratosis
  – callosities
  – cholesteatoma
  – cholesteatoma, middle ear
  – ichthyosis
  – ichthyosiform erythroderma, congenital
  – hyperkeratosis, epidermolytic
  – ichthyosis, lamellar
  – ichthyosis vulgaris
  – ichthyosis, x-linked
  – Sjögren–Larsson syndrome
  – keratoderma, palmoplantar
  – keratoderma, palmoplantar, diffuse
  – Papillon–Lefèvre disease
  – keratosis follicularis
  – keratosis, seborrheic
  – parakeratosis
  – porokeratosis

– leg dermatoses

– lipomatosis

– lupus erythematosus, cutaneous
  – lupus erythematosus, discoid
  – panniculitis, lupus erythematosus

– mastocytosis
  – mastocytoma
  – mastocytosis, cutaneous
  – urticaria pigmentosa

– nail diseases
  – nail–patella syndrome
  – nails, ingrown
  – nails, malformed
  – onychomycosis
  – paronychia

– necrobiotic disorders
  – granuloma annulare
  – necrobiosis lipoidica

– panniculitis
  – erythema induratum
  – panniculitis, lupus erythematosus
  – panniculitis, nodular nonsuppurative

– photosensitivity disorders
  – dermatitis, photoallergic
  – dermatitis, phototoxic
  – hydroa vacciniforme
  – sunburn
  – xeroderma pigmentosum

– pigmentation disorders
  – argyria
  – Café au lait spots
  – hyperpigmentation
  – melanosis
  – acanthosis nigricans
  – lentigo
  – leopard syndrome
  – Peutz–Jeghers syndrome
  – hypopigmentation
  – albinism
  – albinism, ocular
  – albinism, oculocutaneous
  – Hermansky–Pudlak syndrome
  – piebaldism
  – vitiligo
  – incontinentia pigmenti
  – urticaria pigmentosa
  – xeroderma pigmentosum

– prurigo

– pruritus
  – pruritus ani
  – pruritus vulvae

– pyoderma
  – ecthyma
  – pyoderma gangrenosum

– rosacea
  – rhinophyma

– scalp dermatoses
  – tinea capitis
  – tinea favosa

– scleredema adultorum

– scleroderma, localized

– scleroderma, systemic
  – scleroderma, diffuse
  – scleroderma, limited
  – CREST syndrome

– sebaceous gland diseases
  – acne vulgaris
  – dermatitis, seborrheic
  – mucinosis, follicular
  – rhinophyma
  – sebaceous gland neoplasms

– skin abnormalities
  – acrodermatitis
  – dyskeratosis congenita
  – ectodermal dysplasia
  – Ellis–van Creveld syndrome
  – focal dermal hypoplasia
  – neurocutaneous syndromes
  – Ehlers–Danlos syndrome
  – epidermolysis bullosa
  – epidermolysis bullosa acquisita
  – epidermolysis bullosa dystrophica
  – epidermolysis bullosa, junctional
  – epidermolysis bullosa simplex
  – ichthyosis
  – ichthyosiform erythroderma, congenital
  – hyperkeratosis, epidermolytic
  – ichthyosis, lamellar
  – ichthyosis vulgaris
  – ichthyosis, x-linked
  – Sjögren–Larsson syndrome
  – incontinentia pigmenti
  – port-wine stain
  – pseudoxanthoma elasticum
  – Rothmund–Thomson syndrome
  – sclerema neonatorum
  – xeroderma pigmentosum

– skin diseases, eczematous
  – dermatitis, atopic
  – dermatitis, contact
  – dermatitis, allergic contact
  – dermatitis, photoallergic
  – dermatitis, toxicodendron
  – dermatitis, irritant
  – dermatitis, phototoxic
  – diaper rash
  – dermatitis, occupational
  – dermatitis, exfoliative
  – dermatitis, seborrheic
  – eczema
  – eczema, dyshidrotic
  – intertrigo
  – neurodermatitis

– skin diseases, genetic
  – albinism
  – albinism, ocular
  – albinism, oculocutaneous
  – Hermansky–Pudlak syndrome
  – piebaldism
  – cutis laxa
  – dermatitis, atopic
  – dyskeratosis congenita
  – ectodermal dysplasia
  – Ellis–van Creveld syndrome
  – focal dermal hypoplasia
  – neurocutaneous syndromes
  – Ehlers–Danlos syndrome
  – epidermolysis bullosa
  – epidermolysis bullosa acquisita
  – epidermolysis bullosa dystrophica
  – epidermolysis bullosa, junctional
  – epidermolysis bullosa simplex
  – ichthyosiform erythroderma, congenital
  – hyperkeratosis, epidermolytic
  – ichthyosis, lamellar
  – ichthyosis vulgaris
  – ichthyosis, x-linked
  – incontinentia pigmenti
  – keratoderma, palmoplantar
  – keratoderma, palmoplantar, diffuse
  – Papillon–Lefèvre disease
  – keratosis follicularis
  – pemphigus, benign familial
  – porokeratosis
  – porphyria, erythropoietic
  – porphyrias, hepatic
  – coproporphyria, hereditary
  – porphyria, acute intermittent
  – porphyria cutanea tarda
  – porphyria, hepatoerythropoietic
  – porphyria, variegate
  – protoporphyria, erythropoietic
  – pseudoxanthoma elasticum
  – Rothmund–Thomson syndrome
  – Sjögren–Larsson syndrome
  – xeroderma pigmentosum

– skin diseases, infectious
  – dermatomycoses
  – blastomycosis
  – candidiasis, chronic mucocutaneous
  – candidiasis, cutaneous
  – chromoblastomycosis
  – maduromycosis
  – paracoccidioidomycosis
  – sporotrichosis
  – tinea
  – onychomycosis
  – tinea capitis
  – tinea favosa
  – tinea pedis
  – tinea versicolor
  – paronychia
  – skin diseases, bacterial
  – actinomycosis, cervicofacial
  – angiomatosis, bacillary
  – ecthyma
  – erysipelas
  – erythema chronicum migrans
  – erythrasma
  – granuloma inguinale
  – hidradenitis suppurativa
  – maduromycosis
  – pinta
  – rhinoscleroma
  – staphylococcal skin infections
  – furunculosis
  – carbuncle
  – impetigo
  – staphylococcal scalded skin syndrome
  – syphilis, cutaneous
  – tuberculosis, cutaneous
  – erythema induratum
  – lupus
  – yaws
  – skin diseases, parasitic
  – larva migrans
  – leishmaniasis
  – leishmaniasis, cutaneous
  – leishmaniasis, diffuse cutaneous
  – leishmaniasis, mucocutaneous
  – lice infestations
  – onchocerciasis
  – scabies
  – skin diseases, viral
  – erythema infectiosum
  – exanthema subitum
  – herpes simplex
  – herpes labialis
  – kaposi varicelliform eruption
  – molluscum contagiosum
  – warts
  – condylomata acuminata
  – epidermodysplasia verruciformis

– skin diseases, metabolic
  – adiposis dolorosa
  – lipodystrophy
  – diabetes mellitus, lipoatrophic
  – HIV-associated lipodystrophy
  – necrobiosis lipoidica
  – porphyrias
  – porphyria, erythropoietic
  – porphyrias, hepatic
  – coproporphyria, hereditary
  – porphyria, acute intermittent
  – porphyria cutanea tarda
  – porphyria, hepatoerythropoietic
  – porphyria, variegate
  – protoporphyria, erythropoietic
  – xanthogranuloma, juvenile
  – xanthomatosis
  – Wolman disease
  – xanthomatosis, cerebrotendinous

– skin diseases, papulosquamous
  – dermatitis, seborrheic
  – lichenoid eruptions
  – lichen nitidus
  – lichen planus
  – lichen planus, oral
  – lichen sclerosus et atrophicus
  – pityriasis lichenoides
  – lymphomatoid papulosis
  – parapsoriasis
  – pityriasis lichenoides
  – lymphomatoid papulosis
  – pityriasis
  – pityriasis lichenoides
  – lymphomatoid papulosis
  – pityriasis rosea
  – pityriasis rubra pilaris
  – psoriasis
  – arthritis, psoriatic

– skin diseases, vascular
  – angiomatosis, bacillary
  – Behçet syndrome
  – mucocutaneous lymph node syndrome
  – polyarteritis nodosa
  – pyoderma gangrenosum
  – Sneddon syndrome
  – Takayasu's arteritis
  – temporal arteritis
  – urticaria
  – angioneurotic edema
  – vasculitis, allergic cutaneous

– skin diseases, vesiculobullous
  – acantholysis
  – blister
  – dermatitis herpetiformis
  – eczema, dyshidrotic
  – epidermolysis bullosa
  – epidermolysis bullosa acquisita
  – epidermolysis bullosa dystrophica
  – epidermolysis bullosa, junctional
  – epidermolysis bullosa simplex
  – erythema multiforme
  – Stevens–Johnson syndrome
  – hydroa vacciniforme
  – pemphigoid, benign mucous membrane
  – pemphigoid, bullous
  – pemphigoid gestationis
  – pemphigus
  – pemphigus, benign familial

– skin manifestations

– skin neoplasms
  – sebaceous gland neoplasms
  – sweat gland neoplasms

– skin ulcer
  – leg ulcer
  – foot ulcer
  – diabetic foot
  – varicose ulcer
  – pressure ulcer
  – pyoderma gangrenosum

– sweat gland diseases
  – hidradenitis
  – hidradenitis suppurativa
  – hyperhidrosis
  – sweating, gustatory
  – hypohidrosis
  – miliaria
  – Fox–Fordyce disease
  – sweat gland neoplasms

The list continues at List of MeSH codes (C18).

C17